Abu Bakr Jabir bin Musa bin Abdul Qadir ibn Jaber, better known as Abu Bakr al-Jazairi (1921 – 15 August 2018), was an Algerian Sunni Islamic scholar.

Biography 
Al-Jazairi was born in 1921 in the village of Lioua, close to Tolga, which is located today in the state of Biskra Province in Algeria. In his hometown grew up and received his primary education, and began to memorize the Quran and some Almtun language and jurisprudence of Maliki, and then moved to the city of Biskra, where started to teach in a private school. Then he traveled with his family to Medina, and in the Prophet's Mosque resumed his education way to sit to the circles of scholars and sheikhs where he got permission from the Presidency of the judiciary in Mecca to teach in the Prophet's Mosque. He worked as a teacher in some schools of the Ministry of Education and in Dar Al Hadith in Madinah. When the Islamic University of Madinah opened its doors in 1961, he was one of its first teachers and teachers, and remained there until he retired in 1987.

He was under the teachings of sheiks as Naim Al-Nuaimi, Issa Mutawqi and Tayeb Al-Aqbi in Algeria, and Omar Berry and Mohammed Al-Hafiz in Medina. One of his disciples was Saleh Al Maghamsi.

Abu Bakr al-Jazairi was widely known for teaching in the Prophet's Mosque for 50 years and in Islamic University of Medina, which earned his lessons and books great momentum. His book The Platform of the Muslim is one of his most widely accepted works in the Arab countries. He refused to compliment by the financial sector and warned against riba in his book to the prayers. He wrote a book in particular his advice to every Shiite.

He died in Medina on Wednesday 15 August 2018 at the age of 97.

Political and scientific ideas 
Before leaving Algeria he was involved in politics and participated in the Bayan party. He also participated in the establishment of the Unionist Youth Movement, a unitary Islamic movement, later known for his opposition to the Houari Boumédiène regime. After settling in Saudi Arabia, he focused on the scientific side without forgetting to talk about ideological and politics. He declared his opposition to atoning the Muslim rulers and exiting them. He believed that all this was achieved only in the light of the Quran and Sunnah. In the jihad, he was against the Soviet occupation of Afghanistan in the 1980s.

Works 
He has written a large number of works, including

Messages of the Algerian
The Muslim curriculum
The doctrine of the believer
The Simplest of Interpretations of the Speech of The Great and Most High, a tafsir of the Qur'an
Muslim woman
Islamic country
Fundamentals of Jurisprudence
The perfection of the nation in the goodness of its faith
These are the Jews
Rahman appeals to the people of faith

References

1921 births
2018 deaths
Algerian Maliki scholars
Algerian writers
Academic staff of the Islamic University of Madinah
People from Biskra
21st-century Algerian people